William John Slater,  (29 April 1927 – 18 December 2018),  also commonly known as W. J. Slater, was an English professional footballer. Slater made the majority of his appearances for Wolverhampton Wanderers, with whom he won three league championships and the FA Cup.

Career
Slater started his career as a 16-year-old amateur at Blackpool in 1944 and played in the 1951 FA Cup Final in which Blackpool lost to Newcastle United, becoming the last amateur to play in an FA Cup Final at Wembley. Another record he jointly holds is Blackpool's fastest-ever goal: 11 seconds into a game against Stoke City on 10 December 1949. This was matched by James Quinn in 1995. Slater made his Blackpool debut on 10 September 1949, in a goalless draw at Aston Villa. As an inside-forward, he competed with Allan Brown for the number 10 position for the majority of his time at the seaside.

After finishing college, in December 1951 he moved to Brentford where he made 8 appearances and then, in August 1952, joined Wolverhampton Wanderers as a part-time professional. He remained at Molineux until 1963, making 339 total appearances and scoring 25 goals. He won three Football League championships (1953–54, 1957–58, 1958–59), as well as being runners-up (1954–55, 1959–60). He also won an FA Cup (1960, against Blackburn Rovers, in the year he was voted Footballer of the Year). He gained 12 caps for England (including four in the 1958 World Cup) and 20 amateur caps.

At the World Cup he played all four of England's matches, the first two at left half and then in midfield. In the second game against Brazil he marked the influential midfielder Didi effectively, with England securing a 0–0 draw. Slater also represented Great Britain at the 1952 Summer Olympics. He also played cricket for Warwickshire's second XI, in both the Second XI Championship and the Minor Counties Championship.

In July 1963, he returned to Brentford and later played for Northern Nomads.

Later life
In 1982, Slater was appointed an OBE for his services to sport. A CBE followed in 1998. In February 2009, his daughter Barbara Slater was chosen to be the first female Director of Sport at the BBC. Slater died on 18 December 2018, aged 91, from complications of Alzheimer's disease.

Honours
Wolverhampton Wanderers
First Division
Champions: 1953–54, 1957–58, 1958–59
Runners-up: 1954–55, 1959–60
FA Cup
Winners: 1959–60

Blackpool
FA Cup
Runners-up: 1950–51

Other
Wolverhampton Wanderers Hall of Fame
Order of the British Empire: 1982 Officer (Civil)
Order of the British Empire: 1998 Commander (Civil)
FWA Footballer of the Year: 1960

References
General

Wolverhampton Wanderers profile

Specific

1927 births
2018 deaths
People from Clitheroe
English footballers
England international footballers
1958 FIFA World Cup players
Blackpool F.C. players
Brentford F.C. players
Wolverhampton Wanderers F.C. players
English Football League players
Footballers at the 1952 Summer Olympics
Olympic footballers of Great Britain
English cricketers
England amateur international footballers
Commanders of the Order of the British Empire
Northern Nomads F.C. players
Association football inside forwards
Alumni of the University of Leeds
Association football fullbacks
Association football wing halves
FA Cup Final players